A dildo is a sex toy that also comes as a double dildo.

Dildo may also refer to:

 Dildo, Newfoundland and Labrador, Canada
 Dildo Island, Canada
 Dildo Key, Florida, USA
 Dildo cactus (disambiguation), several species of long, narrow cactus

See also 
DilDog, handle of Christien Rioux, cofounder and scientist for Veracode
Armageddon Dildos, German electro-industrial musical duo